Salzburgite has a general empirical formula of Pb2Cu2Bi7S12 and an orthorhombic crystal structure.  This mineral  is very similar to paarite in that they both have nearly the same empirical formulas.  They are both of the bismuthinite - aikinite series.  Salzburgite was named after the region in which it was found, Salzburg, Austria.

References

Sulfosalt minerals
Lead minerals
Copper minerals
Bismuth minerals
Orthorhombic minerals
Minerals in space group 26